The One Before the Last is a 2000 album by Gigolo Aunts.  It is a collection of rare and unreleased material on the Spanish Bittersweet Recordings label.  The album includes the single, "The Girl from Yesterday", a cover of Nacha Pop's "Chica de Ayer"  from their 1980 album, Nacha Pop.

Track listing
Spanish Version (Bittersweet Recordings) Catalog Number: BS-002-CD (2000)

"The Girl from Yesterday"  (Antonio Vega)  3:44
"Kay and Michael"  (Gibbs/Hurley)  2:18
"The Shift to Superoverdrive"  (Gibbs/Hurley)  3:44
"To Whoever"  (Gibbs/Hurley)  4:10
"Sulk with Me"  (Gibbs/Hurley)  4:10
"Hey Lucky"  (Gibbs/Hurley)  3:07
"Kinda Girl"  (Jules Shear/Gibbs/Hurley)  3:17
"Wishing You the Worst"  (Gibbs/Hurley)  2:53
"Sway"  (Gibbs/Hurley)  4:35
"Sloe"  (Gibbs/Hurley)  3:25
"Rocking Chair"  (Gibbs/Hurley)  3:42
"The Sun Will Rise Again"  (Gibbs/Hurley)  3:17

References

2000 compilation albums
Gigolo Aunts albums